Tokummia katalepsis is a fossil hymenocarine arthropod from the Burgess Shale as found in a quarry in Marble Canyon in Canada, lived during middle Cambrian (508 million years old). 

At the front of the animal, there are a pair of antennae, possible eyes, mouthparts (mandibles, maxillule and maxilla) and prominent pincer-like maxillipeds. These shows the oldest record of arthropod pincers. Posterior to the maxillipeds are 50 leg-bearing trunk segments. Each of its biramous leg has 5-segmented basipods, followed by an exopod (flap-like outer branch) and 7-segmented endopod (leg-like inner branch). The anterior 10 leg pairs have basipodal endites (inner spines) while the remaining leg pairs have widen exopods. The trunk terminated with a pair of caudal rami.

Tokummia is suggested to be a bottom feeder, being able to walk on the sea floor, and to occasionally swim, and used its pincers to catch prey. 

The genus name Tokummia named after Tokumm Creek which runs through the Marble Canyon where it was found. The species name katalepsis means Greek word for "seizing", "gasping" or "holding".

According to the original description of Tokummia, hymenocarines like Tokummia, Branchiocaris, Canadaspis and Odaraia are stem group Mandibulata, the group includes myriapods, hexapods and crustaceans, and this theory is supported in multiple subsequent studies.

References

External links
 
 

Burgess Shale fossils
Fossil taxa described in 2017
Hymenocarina
Cambrian genus extinctions